Latent Recordings is a Canadian independent record label founded in 1981. It was dormant in the 1990s while the Cowboy Junkies were signed to American labels, but began to release independently produced albums in the 2000s. By the late 2000s, it sold downloads and CDs online.

History 
The label was formed in London by Michael Timmins, Alan Anton, Geoff Railton, and Brett Wickens to produce and distribute their music.  After their first three releases, they returned to Canada, where Timmins and Anton formed Cowboy Junkies with Timmins' siblings Margo and Peter.

In Toronto, the label distributed Cowboy Junkies' first two albums before the band signed with RCA, which re-released The Trinity Session internationally. For the next few years the label's releases were sporadic offerings produced by Michael Timmins and/or Peter Moore.

After Cowboy Junkies was released from their record contract—by then with Geffen Records— following their 1998 album Miles from Our Home, they revived Latent Recordings and have released their subsequent albums on that label in Canada.  The records have been licensed to other independent labels, such as Zoë Records in the United States and Strange Fruit Records in the UK, for international release.

In recent years, the label has again become active in releasing work by other artists as well, including Ivy Mairi, Finlayson/Maize, Jerry Leger, Lee Harvey Osmond and Huron.

Catalogue
Most of Latent Recordings releases have been numbered, with the number preceded by "LATEX" (#s 1–5, V14), or "LATEX CD" (#s >5).

 Hunger Project: Alan Anton (guitar), Geoff Railton (drums), Michael Timmins (guitar), & English born Liza Dawson-Whisker (vocals)
 Germinal: Alan Anton (bass), Geoff Railton (drums), Michael Timmins (guitar), & Richard O’Callaghan (soprano and tenor saxophone)
 Cowboy Junkies: Alan Anton (bass), Michael Timmins (guitar), Peter Timmins (drums), & Margo Timmins (vocals)
 The Corndogs: Brodie Lodge (drums, guitar, voice), & Greg Clarke (guitar, bass, voice).  Produced by Peter Moore and Michael Timmins
 Pat Temple and the High Lonesome Players .  Produced by Michael Timmins

See also 
 Lists of record labels

References

External links 
 
 

Canadian independent record labels
Record labels established in 1981
Re-established companies